The Museum Estate of P.I. Tchaikovsky, commonly known as the Tchaikovsky Museum, is a museum in the town of Votkinsk, Udmurtia, Russia, dedicated to the composer Pyotr Ilyich Tchaikovsky, who spent his early childhood there.

The museum contains the piano that Tchaikovsky used and also the cot in which he was born, and toys and other furniture. This museum in Votkinsk can be reached by bus from Izhevsk.

See also 
 Tchaikovsky State House-Museum
 List of music museums

References
54th Music Festival Dedicated to Pyotr Ilyich Tchaikovsky Opens In Udmurtia
Vladimir Putin visits the Tchaikovsky Museum in Votkinsk
NY Times Votkinsk Journal; So It Wheezes. It Was Still Tchaikovsky's Piano.

External links
 Museum Estate of P.I. Tchaikovsky (English)
 Музей-усадьба П.И. Чайковского / Museum Estate of P.I. Tchaikovsky (Russian)
 Муниципальное образование Город Воткинск, официальный сайт / Votkinsk Official Site Museum Estate of P.I. Tchaikovsky (Russian)
 Wikimapia Pyotr Tchaikovsky birthplace and memorial house

Historic house museums in Russia
Music museums
Museum
Museums in Udmurtia
Biographical museums in Russia
Music organizations based in Russia
Objects of cultural heritage of Russia of federal significance
Cultural heritage monuments in Udmurtia